"Good Is Good" is a song by American singer-songwriter Sheryl Crow, and is featured on her 2005 album, Wildflower. It was released as the first single from the album. The single was not commercially successful on the Billboard Hot 100, peaking at No. 64 and staying there for two weeks.  The song succeeded in Canada, reaching the Top 20 in Airplay Charts and becoming an AC hit.

In December 2005, Crow was nominated for a Best Female Pop Vocal Performance Grammy Award for the song, but lost to Kelly Clarkson's "Since U Been Gone".

Music video
The video for "Good Is Good" follows the same concept of art found in the cover of the album and the single, with the singer interacting with images similar to surrealist drawings in movement. At the end of the video there's a scene which was used as the cover of Wildflower.

Track listing
 UK CD (9885348)
 "Good Is Good" – Album Version
 "Good Is Good" – Acoustic Version
 "I Know Why" – Acoustic Version
 "Good Is Good" – Video

Chart performance

References

2005 singles
2005 songs
A&M Records singles
Sheryl Crow songs
Song recordings produced by John Shanks
Songs written by Jeff Trott
Songs written by Sheryl Crow